

Education

Dr. Pierre Wilbert Orelus, an educator and a prolific writer, was born in Port-au-Prince, Haiti, to a working-class family. After graduating from Lycee Alexandre Petion (a public high school) in 1991, he went on to study social work at the faculty of Human Sciences but he did not complete it. Pierre left his native land for the United States in the early 1990s. While he was in his early 20s, he attended a community college during the day with his older brother, Lyonel Orelus, while at the same time taking ESL classes at a community center in Cambridge, Massachusetts, at night in order to improve his English skills.

After he completed an associate degree in social work at Massachusetts Bay Community College, he attended the University of Massachusetts, Boston, where he completed his BA in social work with a minor in human advocacy. Pierre's goal was to go to law school right after finishing his bachelor's degree. However, he chose not to pursue such a goal, as he felt that not being a native English speaker would hinder him from successfully and effectively arguing and defending court cases. Orelus later realized that he was ill-thinking of himself, for there are lawyers whose English is not their first language who have been as successful as their native counterparts.	

Instead of going to law school, Orelus went on to earn a master's degree in applied linguistics with a concentration on bilingual education at the same university. While finishing his master, he was granted a teaching position at a public high school, Jeremiah Burke High School, where he taught reading, writing and English as a second language (ESL) to immigrant students as well as to native born. Professor Orelus taught at that high school for 3 years. He then went back to graduate school to earn a doctorate in education with a concentration on language, literacy and culture. While he was a doctoral student, he wrote his first book titled Education Under Occupation:The Heavy Price of Living in a Neocolonized and Globalized World for which he received much recognition.

Early life

From birth until Pierre was 11 years old or so, he lived in a small rural place called Beauge, located about 60 miles from Port-au-Prince and 300 miles from the Dominican Republic. He is the youngest of his mothers’ seven children and one out of the four that have survived. Pierre was born out of wedlock. His father was, too, born out of wedlock. One of Pierre's twin sisters died while she was only 3 months old, while the other who survived became mentally ill in her adult life for several years. She was never fully recovered until she died while she was only 43 years old. Similar to her mother, Pierre's eldest sister gave birth to 6 children and only two of them have survived.

Pierre's father was a carpenter, who did not know how to read or write, while his mother was an entrepreneur, who did not go beyond sixth grade. When Pierre's mother was about 14-year old, she was forced to drop out of school so she could work with her mother, who was aging. As a single parent, Pierre's mother toiled in the most extreme conditions to support her children and her aging mother. She often had to leave Pierre behind with her mother for days to go to a remote area in Haiti called Fond Verrettes to sell alimentary products, like rice, beans, and sugar, to street vendors who, in turn, resold what they bought from her in order to be able to provide for themselves and their families.

In Haiti, this type of informal commercial transaction is happening everywhere and has been the means by which working-class people have survived, particularly the masses. Pierre's most humble experience with his mother was when she took him and his siblings to visit Fond Verrettes, where she did most her commercial transactions as an entrepreneur. 
Fonds Verrettes was, and still is, cold. It's located near the Dominican Republic–a country that shares a border with Haiti. While visiting his mother, Pierre was saddened to see the tiny and cold room where she was sleeping. This room was nothing but a beat-up little storage made of dirt floor and leaky roof. 
Since there was no electricity in her room, Pierre's mother used a lamp at night to read her Holy bible and also to get around. Although Pierre was happy to visit the place where his mother was earning a living to raise him and his siblings, Pierre was shocked to see conditions she was living in. Bearing Witness to the condition in which his mother labored to provide for him and his older siblings inspired Pierre to develop much respect, admiration, and love for his mother in particular and for working class single mothers in general. His mother toiled in such condition for nearly forty years until her body gave up on her. 
Fortunately, around the same time when my mother stopped laboring, Pierre's older brother managed to immigrate to the United States to seek a better life. He immediately became the main provider of the whole family since Pierre's mother could no longer work and his father deserted Pierre after his older brother left Haiti in search of a better life. Pierre's older siblings sacrificed their lives, including their education, to support him throughout his schooling and beyond, and he shows his infinite indebt to them for their sacrifice and unconditional love throughout his scholarly work.

Work and Research

A former bilingual social worker and public high school teacher, Dr. Orelus is currently a tenured associate professor at Fairfield University and the director of the Teaching and Foundation Master program housed in the Educational Studies and Teacher Preparation Department. He also served as chair of this department. Before joining Fairfield University, Dr. Orelus was an associate professor and the coordinator of the Bilingual Education and TESOL programs in the Curriculum and Instruction department at New Mexico State University, Las Cruces, New Mexico. Dr. Orelus is the past program chair and chair of both the Paulo Freire and Postcolonial SIGs (Special Interest Group) at American Educational Research Association. 

His research is intersectional examining various ways and the degree to which race, gender, and language intersect to impact people's lives. Throughout his work, Professor Orelus has looked at the ways in which these factors have limited minority people's life chances and opportunities. Dr. Orelus has authored numerous articles examining these issues. His work has appeared in top peer-reviewed journals, including the Journal of Black Studies and Race, Gender, andClass journals. Dr. Orelus has written and co-written 21 books. He is known for his scholarly work on postcolonial and transnational issues and race and language inequities in schools.

Honors and awards

Professor Orelus has received several awards and fellowships, including New Mexico State University Exceptional Achievements in Creative Scholarly Activity Award, New Mexico State Dean of Education award for Excellence in Research, ALANA Minority Fellowship, and New Perspectives Fellowship.

Artistic Endeavors

Poet

Pierre first started writing poetry and performing as a poet since high school. He went on to continue to do so until after he became a university professor. Although he has used some of his poems in his books, he had his first poetry book published in 2022 (Brill publisher).

Books
Dr. Pierre Orelus's most recent books include All English Accents Matter (Rutledge, 2023); Unschooling Racism (Springer, 2020); Living in the Shadows (Brill, 2020). Renowned African American scholar, Cornel West, observed the following about Dr. Orelus after reading his book, The Agony of Masculinity, “ [he] is an intellectual freedom fighter whose deep insights and sharp analyses of institutional racism and black masculinity deserve our attention.”

Public and Scholarly Engagements
Professor Orelus has been invited by colleagues to speak on race, language, and gender issues across college and university campuses, such as Columbia University, Westfield State college, Mount-Holyoke College, Bates college, University of Massachusetts at Amherst, and University of Calgary, Canada. In addition, he has conducted workshops on learning, language, and identity issues designed for k-12 teachers and administrators. Finally, he has appeared on TV programs, such as ABC local TV program, EL Paso, Texas, to comment on socio-economic, educational and political events, like the earthquake that occurred in Haiti in 2010.

References
https://link.springer.com/book/10.1007%2F978-3-030-53795-1
https://brill.com/view/title/57500

University of New Mexico faculty
Fairfield University faculty
University of Massachusetts Boston alumni
Year of birth missing (living people)
Living people
21st-century American non-fiction writers
African-American non-fiction writers
21st-century American philosophers
21st-century African-American writers
21st-century American male writers
African-American male writers